Carson Foster (born October 26, 2001) is an American competitive swimmer. He is a three-time gold medalist at the 2019 World Junior Championships and a two-time silver medalist at the 2017 World Junior Championships. He also represented the United States at the Junior Pan Pacific Championships in 2018.

Early life
When Foster was 10 years old he broke the National Age Group record in the 50-yard butterfly for the 10 and under age group, his swim of 29.91 seconds made him the youngest American to swim the race in less than 30 seconds.

International career

2016 US Olympic Trials
Foster competed at the 2016 US Olympic Trials in Omaha, Nebraska in the 400-meter individual medley where he finished ranked 43rd overall in the preliminaries.

2020 US Olympic Trials
At the 2020 US Olympic Trials in Omaha, Nebraska, Foster ranked eighth in the 200-meter freestyle with a time of 1:46.67. He also ranked third in the 400-meter individual medley.

College career
Foster is currently enrolled at the University of Texas at Austin where he represents the Texas Longhorns.

References

External links
 
 

2001 births
Living people
Swimmers from Cincinnati
American male backstroke swimmers
American male butterfly swimmers
American male freestyle swimmers
American male medley swimmers
Texas Longhorns men's swimmers
Medalists at the FINA World Swimming Championships (25 m)
World Aquatics Championships medalists in swimming
21st-century American people